Electronics right to repair is proposed legislation that would provide the practical means for electronics equipment owners to repair their devices. Repair is legal under copyright law and patent law. However, owners and independent technicians are often unable to make their own repairs because of manufacturer limitations on access to repair materials such as parts, tools, diagnostics, documentation and firmware.

Proposed legislation has taken note of the specific power of state governments in the US to require both fair and reasonable contracts ("UDAP") law and General Business Law which allows states to make specific requirements of businesses seeking to do business within their borders. Additionally, under US Law, the Federal Trade Commission has the specific authority to restrict UDAP violations.

While a global concern, the primary debate over the issue has been centered on the United States and within the European Union. Additional efforts are now ongoing in Canada and Australia.

Bloggers, activists and volunteer groups such as Louis Rossmann and the Repair Cafe movement started by Martine Postma are also active promoters of repair rights.

Definition

The right to repair for electronics refers to the concept of allowing end users, consumers as well as businesses, to repair electronic devices they own or service without any manufacturer or technical restrictions. The idea behind this concept is to render electronics easier and cheaper to repair with the goal of prolonging the lifecycle of such devices and reducing electronic waste caused by broken or unused devices.

Four requirements for electronic devices are of particular importance:

 the device should be constructed and designed in a manner that allows repairs to be made easily;
 End users and independent repair providers should be able to access original spare parts and tools (software as well as physical tools) needed to repair the device at fair market conditions;
 repairs should be possible by design and not hindered by software programming;
 the repairability of a device should be clearly communicated by the manufacturer.

While initially driven majorly by automotive consumers protection agencies and the automotive after sales service industry, the discussion of establishing a right to repair not only for vehicles but for any kind of electronic product gained traction as consumer electronics such as smartphones and computers became universally available causing broken and used electronics to become the fastest growing waste stream. Today it's estimated that more than half of the population of the western world has one or more used or broken electronic devices at home that are not introduced back into the market due to a lack of affordable repair. The right to repair movement tries to address these issues by proposing legislation obligating manufacturers to allow access to spare parts and repair tools at fair market prices and design devices in a manner that allows easy repair with the goal of favouring repair over replacement.

Factors that made independent repair more difficult

Product design
Many right to repair advocates claim that modern electronic devices have components that are glued in place or attached in a way that makes them difficult to remove.  However, the motivations behind such designs not always clearcut.  For example, the Google Pixel 6 Pro has a glued battery but includes a plastic tab to aid removal, suggesting that the adhesive was meant for a purpose other than to stymie repair.

Part pairing
New ways to lock devices like part pairing (components of a device are serialized and can not be swapped against others) became increasingly popular among manufacturers. Even the most common repairs such as the replacement of a smartphone display can cause malfunctions due to locks implemented in the software. For example, Apple has gradually restricted the swap of iPhone displays, going from warning messages to removing security features such as Face ID if the display was not swapped by a manufacturer-authorized repair facility. While this trend started in the agricultural sector by tractor manufacturer John Deere, it became a widespread phenomenon in consumer electronics over the past 5 years.

Right to repair by jurisdiction

European Union
In the 2010s the trend of making one's repairs to devices spread from the east into the Western Europe. In July 2017, the European Parliament approved recommendations that member states should pass laws that give consumers the right to repair their electronics, as part of a larger update to its previous Ecodesign Directive from 2009 which called for manufacturers to produce more energy-efficient and cleaner consumer devices. The ability to repair devices is seen by these recommendations as a means to reduce waste to the environment.

With these recommendations, work began on establishing the legal Directive for the EU to support the recommendations, and from which member states would then pass laws to meet the Directive. One of the first areas of focus was consumer appliances such as refrigerators and washing machines. Some were assembled using adhesives instead of mechanical fasteners which made it impossible for consumers or repair technicians from making non-destructive repairs. The right-to-repair facets of appliances were a point of contention between consumer groups and appliance manufacturers in Europe, the latter who lobbied the various national governments to gain favorable language in the Directive. Ultimately, the EU passed legislation in October 2019 that, after 2021, required manufacturers of these appliances to be able to supply replacement parts to professional repairmen for ten years from manufacture. The legislation did not address other facets related to right-to-repair, and activists noted that this still limited the consumer's ability to perform their own repairs.

The EU also has directives toward a circular economy which are aimed toward reducing greenhouse gas emissions and other excessive wastes through recycling and other programs. A new "Circular Economy Action Plan" draft introduced in 2020 includes the electronics right to repair for EU citizens as this would allow device owners to replace only malfunctioning parts rather than replace the entire device, reducing electronics waste. The Action Plan includes additional standardization that would aid toward rights to repair, such as common power ports on mobile devices.

United Kingdom
The British government introduced Right to Repair law that went into effect on July 1, 2021. Under the law, electronic appliance manufacturers are required to be able to provide consumers with spare parts for "simple and safe" repairs, such as a door hinge for a washing machine, while requiring manufacturers to make other parts available to professional repair shops for more complicated parts. The law gave companies a two-year grace period to come into compliance.

France 
France has taken a somewhat different approach than the EU in general and has adopted a requirement that manufacturers contribute to a repairability scoring system  The scope of the system is limited at this time and the results are not yet audited, although both auditing and expansion are contemplated.  The goal is to allow consumers to consider repair as a buying criteria before making a purchase.  This has already resulted in the disclosure of repair documentation that had previously not been widely available - at least in the case of Samsung.

United States

General background
The right to repair concept has generally come from the United States. The earliest known published reference using the phrase comes from the auto industry dating back to 2003  with repeated attempts in the US Congress to pass legislation. Within the automotive industry, Massachusetts passed the United States' first Motor Vehicle Owners' Right to Repair Act in 2012, which required automobile manufacturers to sell the same service materials and diagnostics directly to consumers or to independent mechanics as they provide exclusively to their dealerships. The Massachusetts statute was the first to pass among several states, such as New Jersey, which had also passed a similar bill through their Assembly. Facing the potential of a variety of slightly different requirements, major automobile trade organizations signed a Memorandum of Understanding in January 2014 using the Massachusetts' law as the basis of their agreement for all 50 states starting in the 2018 automotive year.  A similar agreement was reached by the Commercial Vehicle Solutions Network to apply to over-the-road trucks.

Digital Right to Repair Coalition 
Officially founded in 2013 - the Digital Right to Repair Coalition, also known as The Repair Association using the website repair.org, has led nearly all state legislative efforts in the United States and has influenced the formation of similarly focused advocacy groups around the world.  The Coalition is a 501 c6 trade association incorporated in New Jersey and funded entirely by membership dues.  The goal of the coalition is to support the aftermarket for technology products through advocating for repair-friendly laws, standards, regulations and policies.  As such, its members are engaged in repairs, resale, refurbishment, reconfiguration and recycling regardless of industry.

Members of the Coalition Advisory Board include industry experts in repair, cyber-security, copyright law, medicine, agriculture, international trade, consumer rights, contracts, e-waste, eco-design standards, software engineering and legislative advocacy.

The Coalition filed their first legislative action in South Dakota in January 2014 as SB.136 (Latterell).  Four states followed in 2015 - New York (S.3998 Boyle/A.6068 Morelle), Minnesota (SF 873 Osmek/ HF 1048 Hertaus), Massachusetts (H.3383 Cronin/S. Kennedy), and Nebraska (LB 1072 Haar).  Tennessee (SB888/H1382 Jernigan) and Wyoming (HB 0091 Hunt) were added in 2016.   The following year - 2017 - new bills were filed in North Carolina (HB663 Richardson), Kansas (HB2122 Barker), Illinois (HB3030 Harris), Iowa (HF556 and SF2028), Missouri (HB1178 McCreery), New Hampshire (HB1733 Luneau) and New Jersey (A4934 Moriarty).  2018 added Oklahoma, Hawaii, Georgia, Virginia, Vermont and Washington. 2019  added Oregon, Nevada, Indiana and Montana. 2020 was shortened by the Pandemic but added Maine, Idaho, Alabama, Maryland, Pennsylvania and Colorado.  2021 added Florida, Delaware, Texas, and South Carolina for a total of 27 states involved in 2021.

Legislative focus for state legislation 
Legislation intended to use the power of general business law in states for general repair of devices including a digital electronic part is based on the Automotive MOU from 2014.  Template legislation avoided any requirements to change the format of documentation, the method of delivery of existing parts, tools, diagnostics or information, nor any requirements to disclose any trade secrets.  Manufacturers are permitted to charge fair and reasonable prices for physical parts and tools, and are limited in their charges for information that is already posted online.

The Coalition suggests that state legislation will broadly enable many repairs, but that federal copyright law needs revision with respect to limitations posed by Section 1201 specific to Digital Rights Management ("DRM") and software locks.

Opposition 
Lobbying in opposition has been consistent across 4 major industries - consumer technology, agriculture, home appliances, and medical equipment. The tech industry has lobbied in opposition through groups including TechNet, the Consumer Technology Association ("CTA"), the Entertainment Software Alliance ("ESA"), and the Security Innovation Center (now no longer active).

Large equipment manufacturers for agriculture and construction have lobbied through the Association of Equipment Manufacturers ("AEM")  and their dealership counterparts the Equipment Dealers Association.  Their joint release of the 2018 Statement of Principles  became the subject of media backlash when in January 2021 the promised means to make complete repairs had not been visibly available.   In Nebraska, State Senators behind LB543 - Right to Repair  held their bill in committee pending a negotiation with equipment manufacturers over these promises.  Pending the outcome of negotiations, LB543 may be pushed ahead in 2022.

Medical device manufacturers have used associations Advamed and MITA in opposition.  Several states have exempted medical devices from their legislation - such as New York, Massachusetts and Minnesota, but other states have specifically targeted medical equipment in Arkansas (SB332 passed in the Senate) and California (SB605)  as the pandemic raised questions about how effectively hospitals can control repairs of critical infrastructure.  The California bill was approved by two committees of reference before being blocked in the Appropriations Committee.

The home appliance industry has been represented by the Association of Home Appliance Manufacturers ("AHAM").  Smaller groups such as the Toy Industry Association and the Outdoor Power Equipment Industry ("OPEI") have also been in official opposition as part of the Security Innovation Center group. New Hampshire is the only state so far to consider a bill specific to home appliances in 2021.

On 19 May 2022, the California Right to Repair bill, SB 983, was blocked in the California State Senate Appropriations Committee.

Federal action 
Led by Coalition members iFixit, and the Electronic Frontier Foundation ("EFF"), the Coalition has been regularly engaged in triennial requests for Copyright Exemptions to Section 1201 ("anti-circumvention") since 2015 including the request of exemptions for tinkering with tractors, computers and cell phones.  The US Congress requested an analysis of limitations on repair caused by software-enabled products from the Librarian of Congress in 2016 and a report on the impacts of Section 1201 in 2017  in which members of the Coalition were extensively engaged and widely quoted. In the 2018 round, the exemption for making software modifications to "land-based motor vehicles" was expanded to allow equipment owners to engage the services of third parties to assist with making changes. These changes were endorsed by the American Farm Bureau Federation.

US Senator Ron Wyden (D-OR) and Congresswoman Yvette Clarke (D-NY) filed the first Medical Right to Repair bill in August 2020 in response to the pandemic crisis and availability of ventilators in particular.  In addition to requiring access to manuals and service materials, the bill also lifts the provisions of patent law governing the production of spare parts for the duration of the pandemic.

Congressman Joseph Morelle (D-NY) filed his Fair Repair Act in Congress on June 21, 2021 using his experience as Majority Leader in the New York Assembly and prime sponsor of the Digital Fair Repair Act in New York while in leadership in the Assembly.  The federal bill closely resembles the state version.

In July 2019  the Federal Trade Commission ("FTC") hosted a workshop titled "Nixing the Fix" The Commissioners invited multiple panels of experts to provide testimony in person as well as for all interested parties to provide Evidence of harms, or justification for actions directly to the FTC.  After nearly two years of study, the FTC Report to Congress of May 6, 2021 outlining that their study provided "Scant Evidence" that restriction on repair were to the benefit of consumers.

The Biden Administration issued an Executive Order to the FTC and the Department of Agriculture on July 6, 2021, to widely improve access to repair for both consumers and farmers.  Subsequently, the FTC Chair Lina Khan held two public commission events where commissioners voted to advance Right to Repair as a policy objective.

Additional considerations
In addition to the work of the Coalition - various individuals have stepped forward to drive action directly, such as for starting ballot initiatives.  A ballot initiative was filed in Missouri, but was not certified for inclusion on the 2022 ballot. In March 2021, Louis Rossmann started a crowdfunding campaign to raise $6 million using the GoFundMe platform in order to start a direct ballot initiative to protect consumer right to repair in the Commonwealth of Massachusetts, citing previous similar successes in the automotive industry.   The outcome of these efforts is not yet known.

Companies like Apple, John Deere, and AT&T lobbied against these bills, and created a number of "strange bedfellows" from high tech and agricultural sectors on both sides of the issue, according to Time.

In late 2017, users of Apple, Inc. older iPhone models discovered evidence that recent updates to the phone's operating system, iOS, were purposely throttling the speed of the phone. This led many to accuse Apple of deliberately sabotaging the performance of older iPhones to compel customers to buy new models more frequently.  Apple disputed this assumed intention, stating instead that the goal of the software was to prevent overtaxing older lithium-ion batteries, which have degraded over time, to avoid unexpected shutdowns of the phone. Furthermore, Apple allowed users to disable the battery throttling feature in an iOS update but maintained that it would not be advisable to do so, since the throttling feature only kicked in when a battery had significantly degraded.  Additionally, Apple allowed users of affected iPhones to obtain service to replace batteries in their phones for a reduced cost of service ( compared to ) for the next six months. However, the "right to repair" movement pointed out that such a scenario could have been handled if Apple allowed consumers to purchase third-party batteries and possess the instructions to replace it at lower cost to the consumer.

In April 2018, the Federal Trade Commission sent notice to six automobile, consumer electronics, and video game console manufacturers, later revealed through a Freedom of Information Act request to be Hyundai, Asus, HTC, Microsoft, Sony, and Nintendo, stating that their warranty practices may violate the Magnuson-Moss Warranty Act. The FTC specifically identified that informing consumers that warranties are voided if they break a warranty sticker or seal on the unit's packaging, use third-party replacement parts, or use third-party repair services is a deceptive practice, as these terms are only valid if the manufacturer provides free warranty service or replacement parts. Both Sony and Nintendo released updated warranty statements following this notice.

In April 2018, US Public Interest Research Group issued a statement defending Eric Lundgren over his sentencing for creating the ‘restore disks’ to extend the life of computers.

The Library of Congress, as part of its three-year review of exemptions to the DMCA, approved an exemption in October 2018 that would allow for one to bypass copyright-protection mechanisms used in land vehicles, smartphones and home appliances for the ability to maintain ("to make it works in accordance with its original specifications and any changes to those specifications authorized for that device or system") or repair ("restoring of the device or system to the state of working in accordance with its original specifications and any changes to those specifications authorized for that device or system") the device. In its 2021 recommendations, the Library of Congress further extend the exemption, with favorable right-to-repair considerations for automobiles, boats, agricultural vehicles, and medical equipment, as well as modifying prior rules related to other consumer goods.

Senator Elizabeth Warren, as part of her campaign for president, laid out plans for legislation related to agriculture in March 2019, stated her intent to introduce legislation to affirm the right to repair farm equipment, potentially expanding this to other electronic devices.

In August 2019, Apple announced a program where independent repair shops may have the ability to buy official replacement parts for Apple products.  Several  operators became Authorized under their "IRP" program but many smaller repair operators avoided the option due to legally onerous burdens.  A list of authorized IRP Providers is not available on the website making it difficult to assess the level of adoption.

In the midst of the COVID-19 pandemic, where medical equipment became critical for many hospitals, iFixit and a team of volunteers worked to publish the largest known collection of manuals and service guides for medical equipment, using information crowdsourced from hospitals and medical institutions. They incorporated all the materials found on Frank's Hospital Workshop and expanded it more broadly with a more intuitive search tool. iFixit had found, like with consumer electronics, some of the more expensive medical equipment had used means to make non-routine servicing difficult for end-users and requiring authorized repair processes, which during the emergency conditions of the pandemic was not acceptable.

On August 6, 2020, senator Ron Wyden and representative Yvette Clarke introduced the Critical Medical Infrastructure Right-to-Repair Act of 2020 (text) which focuses on preventing health professionals from being liable to copyright law when attempting to repair devices that would make it easier for "COVID-19 aid."

The Federal Trade Commission (FTC) issued a report "Nixing the Fix" in May 2021 to Congress, outlining issues around corporations' policies that limit repairs on consumer goods that it considered in violation of trade laws, and outlined steps that could be done to better enforce this. This included self-regulation by the industries involved, as well as expansion of existing laws such as the Magnuson-Moss Warranty Act or new laws to give the FTC better enforcement to protect consumers from overzealous repair restrictions. On July 9, 2021, President Joe Biden signed Executive Order 14036, "Promoting Competition in the American Economy", a sweeping array of initiatives across the executive branch. Among them included instructions to the FTC to craft rules to prevent manufacturers from preventing repairs performed by owners or independent repair shops. About two weeks after the EO was issued, the FTC made a unanimous vote to enforce the right to repair as policy and will look to take action against companies that limit the type of repair work that can be done at independent repair shops.

Apple announced in November 2021 that it would be allowing consumers to order parts and make repairs on Apple products, initially with iPhone 12 and 13 devices but eventually rolling out to include Mac computers. The iPhone 12 and 13 service was made available to US customers as of April 27, 2022, while the Mac portion was made available as of August 22, 2022 and plans to expand to Europe and other countries "later this year." According to Apple, "Customers join more than 5,000 Apple Authorized Service Providers (AASPs) and 3,500 Independent Repair Providers who have access to these parts, tools, and manuals", further stating that "in the US, eight out of 10 Apple customers are located within 20 minutes of an authorized service provider." Reception to the program has been mixed, with Right to Repair advocates like Louis Rossmann stating that the program is a step in the right direction, but criticizing the omission of certain parts, and the need to input a serial number before ordering parts.

See also 
 Repair café
 Louis Rossmann
 Repairability
 Takeback, when sellers or manufacturers accept returns of products at the end of their lives

References

Right to Repair
Consumer electronics

de:Reparatur#Recht auf Reparatur